Greenville Triumph SC is a professional soccer team based in Greenville, South Carolina, United States. The club began play in USL League One in 2019.

History 
The formation of USL D3 was first announced in April 2017, and league officials began touring the country looking for candidate cities for new soccer clubs. USL D3 vice president Steven Short visited Greenville in July 2017, and told local reporters at the time that Greenville was one of the league's top candidates. In January 2018, the league began announcing teams that would play in their 2019 inaugural season. The formation of a USL D3 club in Greenville was officially announced on March 13, 2018, with local entrepreneur Joe Erwin named as the principal owner. The Greenville team was the third team to join the league after Tormenta FC and FC Tucson, two clubs which already existed and played in the Premier Development League. The team qualified for the playoffs in their first year of existence.

The team's name, Greenville Triumph SC, as well as its logo and colors were announced on August 9, 2018. On August 27, the team announced that the team would be coached by former U.S. national team player John Harkes, who had previously served as head coach of USL club FC Cincinnati for the 2016 season. Harkes was signed on a three-year contract.

On June 8, 2021, GTSC announced they will be fielding a women's side to compete in the new USL W League beginning in 2022.

On January 28, 2022, GTSC officials announced that after a two year search for a new stadium location, they had settled on a six-acre site in Mauldin, South Carolina at Bridgeway Station. The proposed stadium would consist of 8,100 seats and be used as a multi-sport venue as well. If the stadium is approved by county officials, the project is expected to be completed by the opening of the 2023 season.

Sponsorship

Club culture 

The Greenville Triumph's supporters group The Reedy River Riot began in earnest when members of their leadership began discussing strategies to create a professional soccer team in Greenville. A social media blitz of #usl2gvl and a Change.org petition in June 2017 began this process. The petition to “Bring Professional Soccer to Greenville” garnered over 900 signatures and caught the eye of the USL leadership and the local prospective ownership group. Their dream was fulfilled in March 2018 with the announcement that Greenville had been chosen as a founding member of the USL D3.

Throughout the conception and build out of the team, the initial membership of the Reedy River Riot began meeting to discuss our vision for a supporters group. Their leadership consists of a group of soccer fanatics based in and around Greenville who have served together in leadership positions within numerous soccer supporter groups in the past. They draw on these experiences to begin the story of the Riot.

Players and staff

Current roster

Staff

Record

Year-by-year

Honors
  USL League One
 Champions: 2020
 USL League One Regular Season
 Winners: 2020

Player honors

See also
Greenville Liberty SC

Notes

References

External links 
 

 
Association football clubs established in 2018
2018 establishments in South Carolina
Sports in Greenville, South Carolina
Soccer teams in South Carolina
USL League One teams